Old Statehouse is a historic state capitol building located on The Green at Dover, Kent County, Delaware. It was built between 1787 and 1792, and is a two-story, five bay, brick structure in a Middle Georgian style. The front facade features a fanlight over the center door and above it a Palladian window at the center of the second floor. It has a shingled side gabled roof topped with an octagonal cupola. A number of attached wings were added between 1836 and 1926. From 1792 to 1932 it was the sole seat of State government, while from 1792 until 1873 it served also as Kent County Court House.

The state house was remodeled in 1873 to reflect a Victorian style and restored in 1976 to its original appearance. Extensive renovations of the State House also took place in 2007.

It was added to the National Register of Historic Places in 1971. It is located in the Dover Green Historic District. It is now part of the Delaware National Historic Park and a museum run by the Delaware Division of Historic and Cultural Affairs. It can be toured Monday–Saturday 9–4:30 and Sundays 1:30–4:30 free of charge.

Gallery

See also
 History of early modern period domes

References

External links 

 Old State House – official site
 

Historic American Buildings Survey in Delaware
Former state capitols in the United States
Government buildings on the National Register of Historic Places in Delaware
Georgian architecture in Delaware
Government buildings completed in 1792
Buildings and structures in Dover, Delaware
Museums in Dover, Delaware
History museums in Delaware
National Register of Historic Places in Dover, Delaware
Individually listed contributing properties to historic districts on the National Register in Delaware